Daniel Chavez Wright (born July 2, 1989), known professionally as 3D Friends, is an American singer-songwriter and record producer from Austin, Texas. Daniel formed the project in 2009 as a solo project, but has collaborated with other musicians in the past. Wright was previously signed to Hype Music, a collaboration between Extreme Music and MTV.

Wright's single Lina Magic was chosen as the theme song for MTV's North American version of the hit television show Skins. His music has also been featured in many other MTV productions, notably the World of Jenks, Underemployed, The Pauly D Project, and Punk'd, in addition to ABC's Revenge and Bravo's Gallery Girls.

Wright's music style been compared to singer-songwriter Elliott Smith and Thomas Mars from the French alternative band Phoenix by the American radio journalist Nic Harcourt. He lists his influences as Destroyer and The Radio Dept.

Discography

Studio albums
 Imaginative Things (2011)

EPs
 Time to Get Away (2010)
 The Way That It Goes (2011)
 Summer Break (2014)

With Aaron Carter
 "She Just Wanna Ride (feat. 3D Friends)" (2022, Single)
 "Feel Anything (feat. Twista, 3D Friends)" (2022, Single)

References

External links 

 
 

Musical groups established in 2009
Musicians from Austin, Texas
American indie rock musicians
Indie rock musical groups from Texas
Dream pop musicians
Ambient musicians